H. R. Manjanath was a Member of the legislative assembly (1967–1971) from Kumta constituency to the Karnataka state, Bangalore.

References
 Election Commission of India Statistical report - 1967 Karnataka state assembly elections

Kannada people
Mysore MLAs 1967–1972
Possibly living people